Aleksei Nikolayevich Shaposhnikov (March 16, 1899July 4, 1962) was a Soviet football player.

Honours
 RSFSR Champion: 1920, 1927
 USSR Champion: 1920, 1923

International career
Shaposhnikov made his debut for USSR on November 16, 1924, in a friendly against Turkey.

External links
  Profile

1899 births
1962 deaths
People from Orekhovo-Zuyevo
People from Vladimir Governorate
Soviet footballers
Soviet Union international footballers
FC Torpedo Moscow players
Soviet football managers
Russian football managers
FC Rotor Volgograd managers
Association football forwards
Sportspeople from Moscow Oblast